Woodloch Pines (also known as Woodloch) is an all-inclusive resort located in Hawley, Pennsylvania on Lake Teedyuskung in the northeast Pocono Mountains Lake Region. The nearest large city is Scranton, which is 40 miles away. The resort has been owned by the Kiesendahl Family since 1958 and is open all year round.  In recent years, Woodloch has expanded to include Woodloch Springs, a championship golf course and housing community, and The Lodge at Woodloch, a destination spa. Woodloch Pines, Woodloch Springs, and The lodge at Woodloch are all separate resorts.

History
Mary Mould had been vacationing at Lake Teedyuskung for years when she married Harry Kiesendahl in 1944.  They settled on Long Island where they raised their 3 children, John, Nancy, and Steve.  Harry saw an advertisement in the New York Times for a small boarding house for sale on Lake Teedyuskung.  Soon after, the Kiesendahls purchased the resort.  In 1958, Mary and the children moved to the resort while Harry commuted from Long Island on the weekends. Its original  consisted of a main lodge, an annex, and two cottages, which could accommodate 40 guests. There was no running water and one year-round employee. Around this time was when the reports started to come about Teedy, the mysterious lake monster who supposedly lives at the bottom of Lake Teedyuskung.

In 1959, Mary and Harry Kiesendahl were joined by friends Don and Marge Kranich. After several years of building, Woodloch Pines had doubled in size. By 1983, the resort covered ,  of shoreline on Lake Teedyuskung, and had 135 guest rooms. Woodloch is still run by the Kiesendahl family, with son John as the current president and CEO.

Woodloch and the Boy Scouts of America
Daniel Carter Beard, one of the original founders of the Boy Scouts of America, once owned three parcels of land on Lake Teedyuskung and built the original cabin home of the Boy Scouts there.  "Wild Lands" was the mess hall for the Boy Scouts and stood on what eventually became Woodloch property for over eighty years.  In 2011, Woodloch donated "Wild Lands" back to the Boy Scouts.  The cabin was disassembled and transported to the Goose Pond Boy Scout Reservation on Lake Wallenpaupack, where the ongoing project of reassembling the cabin in its original form is taking place.

Additions
Woodloch Springs, opened in 1991, is a community and golf course with over 400 homes of varying sizes that can be purchased or rented by Woodloch Pines’ guests. The Springs has also been used for corporate retreats.

The Lodge at Woodloch is a destination spa that opened in 2006.  The Lodge, designed by architecture firm Cooper Carry, is a separate facility from the Woodloch Pines resort. It is five minutes away from The Pines, across the street from Woodloch Springs, on Little Lake Teedyuskung. The spa resort is operated by the Kiesendahl family.

The Reserve at Woodloch is a real estate project that is currently in development.

Woodloch pines has won multiple awards like “#1 Best Resort for Families in 2019” by USA Today, “Family Vacation Critic Favorite” by the family vacation critic, "TOP 25 HOTELS FOR FAMILIES IN THE UNITED STATES” by TripAdvisor's Travelers' Choice Awards 2019, “TOP 10 HOTELS & RESORTS FOR YOUNG CHILDREN” by grandparents.com, “BEST RESORT FOR FAMILY REUNIONS” by ResortsandLodges.com, and “THE NUMBER ONE PLACE TO WORK IN THE STATE OF PENNSYLVANIA” by BEST PLACES TO WORK IN PENNSYLVANIA.

Rooms and services 
Woodloch Pines is an all inclusive family friendly resort open all year round. Woodloch Pines has hotel rooms and houses that can be rented which have 3-6 bedrooms. Besides Lake Teedyuskung Woodloch Pines has 2 pools, escape rooms, staff shows, and special activities that you can earn the Woodloch Pines medal.  Woodloch pines has 2 American style dining rooms.

References

Further reading

External links 

Pocono Mountains
Resorts in Pennsylvania
Buildings and structures in Pike County, Pennsylvania
Tourist attractions in Pike County, Pennsylvania